The Futsal tournament of the 2009 Lusophony Games was played in Lisbon, Portugal. The venue was the Pavilhão Atlântico. The tournament was played from 12  to 17 July 2009, and there was just the men's competition.

Futsal medal table by country

Male Competition

Round Robin

See also
ACOLOP
Lusophony Games
2009 Lusophony Games

Futsal
2009
2009 in futsal
2009